HMI may refer to:

Companies and organizations
 Hahn-Meitner-Institut, now Helmholtz-Zentrum Berlin, a German research institute
 Hanson Musical Instruments, a manufacturer of electric guitars
 Hartz Mountain Industries, an American holding company
 HD Mining International, a mining company in Vancouver, British Columbia, Canada
 Hetrick-Martin Institute, an LGBT youth organization in New York City
 High Mountain Institute, in Leadville, Colorado, United States
 Himalayan Mountaineering Institute, in Darjeeling, India
 HMI Hotel Group, a hotel management company in Japan
 Holistic Management International, an American non-profit organization
 HornAfrik Media Inc, a media organization based in Mogadishu, Somalia
 Hotel Meliá, in Ponce, Puerto Rico
 Houston Mechatronics, Inc, see Houston Mechatronics, Inc
 Hualien Media International, a global entertainment company in Taipei, Taiwan
 Muslim Students' Association (Indonesia)

Technology
 Helioseismic and Magnetic Imager, on the Solar Dynamics Observatory spacecraft
 hexamethyleneimine, an organic compound
 Human–machine interaction
 Human–machine interface
 Hydrargyrum medium-arc iodide lamp, used for stage lighting

Other uses
 Hami Airport, in Xinjiang, China
 Hammond–Whiting (Amtrak station), in Indiana
 Her Majesty's Inspectorate of Education, in Scotland
 Northern Huishui Miao language, spoken in China